England and Ireland have played rugby union internationals against each other since 1875, with England winning the first match at The Oval, London by two goals to nil. (A points scoring system was not used in rugby at the time.) The two teams have played a total of 140 Test matches; with England winning 80 of them, Ireland 52 and 8 resulting in a draw.

Apart from their annual match during the Six Nations Championship, the teams have also met on five other occasions, all won by England. The sides have played three warm-up matches prior to the 2011, 2015 and 2019 World Cups. They played a one-off match in April 1988 to celebrate the millennium of the city of Dublin in which the winners of the 1988 match, England, were awarded the Millennium Trophy. This then became the trophy for the annual match between the teams in the Six Nations Championship. The sides also faced off in the inaugural Autumn Nations Cup which took place in November 2020. 

Ireland achieved a record away winning margin over England when they beat them 32–15 on 12 March 2022, following an early Charlie Ewels red card.

The Millennium Trophy is currently held by Ireland, who won the most recent match 29–16 at the Aviva Stadium clinching the 2023 Six Nations Championship.

Millennium Trophy

The Millennium Trophy is a rugby union award contested annually by England and Ireland as part of the Six Nations Championship. It was initiated in 1988 as part of Dublin's millennial celebrations. The trophy has the shape of a horned Viking helmet. As of 2023, England have won it 20 times, and Ireland 16 times. Ireland retain the Millennium Trophy for 2023 with a Grand Slam title securing win over England in Dublin.

Summary

Overall

Records 
Note: Date shown in brackets indicates when the record was last set.

Results

References

 
England national rugby union team matches
Ireland national rugby union team matches
Six Nations Championship
Rugby union rivalries in Ireland
Rugby union rivalries in England